The 1939 Vermont Catamounts football team was an American football team that represented  the University of Vermont as an independent during the 1939 college football season. In their sixth year under head coach John P. Sabo, the team compiled a 3–3–2 record.

Schedule

References

Vermont
Vermont Catamounts football seasons
Vermont Catamounts football